is a pole vaulter from Japan. His personal best jump is 5.71 metres, achieved in July 2002 in Ichihara.

Achievements

References

1974 births
Living people
Japanese male pole vaulters
Asian Games bronze medalists for Japan
Asian Games medalists in athletics (track and field)
Athletes (track and field) at the 1998 Asian Games
Athletes (track and field) at the 2002 Asian Games
Medalists at the 1998 Asian Games
Medalists at the 2002 Asian Games
Competitors at the 1995 Summer Universiade
World Athletics Championships athletes for Japan
Japan Championships in Athletics winners